is a railway station on the West Japan Railway (JR West) JR Tōzai Line in Kita-ku, Osaka, Japan.

Although officially separated from Osaka Station, the main terminal, passengers can transfer for free from  the JR Kobe Line or the Osaka Loop Line at Osaka to the Tōzai Line at Kitashinchi, and vice versa, with some tickets and passes.

Lines
JR Tōzai Line

Connections
Kitashinchi Station is connected to the following stations:
JR West
Tōkaidō Main Line (JR Kyoto Line, JR Kobe Line), JR Takarazuka Line, Osaka Loop Line - Osaka Station
Osaka Municipal Subway
Yotsubashi Line - Nishi-Umeda Station (Y11)
Hanshin Electric Railway
Main Line - Umeda Station
Keihan Electric Railway
Nakanoshima Line - Watanabebashi Station (via Dojima Underground Shopping Center)

Connections are also available to the following stations Hankyu Railway Umeda Station (approx. 15 minutes), Umeda Station on the subway Midosuji Line (approx. 10 minutes) and Higashi-Umeda Station on the subway Tanimachi Line (approx. 12 minutes).

Layout
This station has an island platform serving two tracks underground.  The station administrates all intermediate stations on the JR Tozai Line.

Surroundings
Kitashinchi
Osaka Ekimae Buildings
Diamor Osaka
Dojima Avanza
Dojima Underground Shopping Center (Dotica)

History 
Kitashinchi Station opened on 8 March 1997, coinciding with the opening of the JR Tōzai Line between Kyobashi and Amagasaki.

Station numbering was introduced in March 2018 with Kitashinchi being assigned station number JR-H44.

References

External links
JR West - Kitashinchi Station 

Railway stations in Japan opened in 1997